The 2008 Canada Masters (also known as the 2008 Rogers Masters and 2008 Rogers Cup for sponsorship reasons) was a tennis tournament played on outdoor hard courts. It was the 119th edition of the Canada Masters for the men (the 107th edition for the women), and was part of the ATP Masters Series of the 2008 ATP Tour, and of the Tier I Series of the 2008 WTA Tour. The men's event took place at the Rexall Centre in Toronto, Ontario, Canada, from July 19 through July 27, 2008, and the women's event at the Uniprix Stadium in Montreal, Quebec, Canada, from July 26 through August 3, 2008. The event was scheduled two weeks earlier than the usual early-August date to avoid conflicting with the 2008 Summer Olympics.

The men's field featured World No. 1, French Open and Wimbledon runner-up Roger Federer, ATP No. 2, French Open and new Wimbledon winner Rafael Nadal, and Australian Open titlist and Canada Masters defending champion Novak Djokovic. Also competing were ATP No. 4, Miami Masters, Pörtschach and Warsaw titlist Nikolay Davydenko, Valencia and s'Hertogenbosch winner David Ferrer, Andy Roddick, James Blake and Andy Murray.

On the women's side were present World No. 1 and French Open champion Ana Ivanovic, Rome Tier I winner and 2007 Canada Masters runner-up Jelena Janković, and reigning Australian Open champion Maria Sharapova. Other top seeded players were French Open semifinalist Svetlana Kuznetsova, Wimbledon semifinalist and Dubai titlist Elena Dementieva, Anna Chakvetadze, Dinara Safina and Vera Zvonareva.

Finals

Men's singles

 Rafael Nadal defeated  Nicolas Kiefer 6–3, 6–2
It was Rafael Nadal's 7th title of the year, and his 30th overall. It was his 3rd Masters title of the year, his 12th overall, and his 2nd win at the event.

Women's singles

 Dinara Safina defeated  Dominika Cibulková 6–2, 6–1
It was Dinara Safina's 3rd title of the year, and her 8th overall. It was her 2nd Tier I title of the year, and overall.

Men's doubles

 Daniel Nestor /  Nenad Zimonjić defeated  Bob Bryan /  Mike Bryan 6–2, 4–6, [10–6]

Women's doubles

 Cara Black /  Liezel Huber defeated  Maria Kirilenko /  Flavia Pennetta 6–1, 6–1

References

External links

Official website
Men's Singles draw
Men's Doubles draw
Men's Qualifying Singles draw
Women's Singles, Doubles and Qualifying Singles draws

 
2008